Marlon Rangel de Almeida (born 22 May 1996) is a Brazilian footballer who plays as a right back for V. League 1 for Binh Dinh FC.

Club career
On 17 July 2018, Rangel signed his first professional transfer with Chaves after his early career  Rangel made his professional debut for Chaves in a 2-0 Primeira Liga loss to C.D. Nacional on 23 December 2018.

References

External links

ZeroZero Profile

1996 births
Living people
People from Linhares
Brazilian footballers
Association football defenders
Esporte Clube Bahia players
C.D. Cinfães players
G.D. Chaves players
Lusitânia F.C. players
Primeira Liga players
Campeonato de Portugal (league) players
Brazilian expatriate footballers
Brazilian expatriate sportspeople in Portugal
Expatriate footballers in Portugal
Sportspeople from Espírito Santo